Victor Laurentius Hartman (30 December 1839 – 15 June 1898) was a Swedish actor.

Hartman studied at Kungliga Teaterns Balett (The Ballet Company of the Royal Theatre) and at Mindre teatern in 1854 to 1856, followed by studies at Kungliga Teaterns Dramatiska Scen (The Dramatic Stage of the Royal Theatre) between 1856 and 1861. At the latter he had actors Johan Jolin and Carl Gustaf Sundberg as teachers. In 1861 he was employed at Dramaten (The Royal Dramatic Theatre) and in 1866 became lead actor at Dramaten. He was for a long time Dramaten's most used actor, and was known for both his lighthearted comedy acts and his more serious works.

Among the first of Hartman's roles that received attention was the role as Paddy in the play Richard Sheridan and as Madinier in Fruarna Montambèche. He is best known for the roles he played in the 1870s and early 1880s, when he played the character Carlo van der Not in Victorien Sardou's Allt för fosterlandet. He also played Henri in De onyttiga, and during that period of his career also acted in the plays Don Cesar de Bazano, Volontären, Ferréol, Ambrosius, and as Gerald in Rolands dotter, de Nanjac in Falska juveler and Achille in the play Christiane.

At the end of March 1885 Hartman suffered from several long bouts of lung disease which prevented him from performing until October of that year. His health never fully recovered and he had to settle for smaller parts and could no longer cope with the workload of playing every night. His last role was as Junot in Madame Sans-Gêne. Hartman was awarded the medal Litteris et Artibus in 1882.

Personal life
Between 1881 and 1892, he was married to actress Ellen Hedlund.

Hartman died on 18 June 1898, a few days after suffering a brain hemorrhage.

References

External links

Swedish male stage actors
1839 births
1898 deaths
19th-century Swedish male actors
Litteris et Artibus recipients